Kongo may refer to various uses of Congo (disambiguation). 

Kongo may also refer to:

Kongo culture
Kingdom of Kongo
Kongo cosmogram
Kongo language or Kikongo, one of the Bantu languages 
Kongo languages
Kongo people
Kongo religion

Places
Kongo, Ghana, a town in Ghana
Kongo Central, formerly Bas-Congo, a province of the Democratic Republic of the Congo
M'banza-Kongo, the capital of Angola's northwestern Zaire Province
Kongo University, in the Democratic Republic of the Congo

People
Cheick Kongo, French heavyweight mixed martial artist and kickboxer
Cyril Kongo (also known as Kongo), (born 1969), French painter and graffiti artist
Kongo Kong (born 1979), American professional wrestler
Shekie Kongo (born 1949), Malawian boxer

Arts and entertainment
Kongo (1932 film), American pre-Code film directed by William J. Cowen

See also
Kongō (disambiguation)
Kongos (disambiguation)
Kongo class (disambiguation)